Peter Dale (born 30 October 1963) is an Australian swimmer. He competed in two events at the 1984 Summer Olympics.

References

External links
 

1963 births
Living people
Australian male freestyle swimmers
Olympic swimmers of Australia
Swimmers at the 1984 Summer Olympics
Place of birth missing (living people)
Commonwealth Games medallists in swimming
Commonwealth Games gold medallists for Australia
Commonwealth Games silver medallists for Australia
Swimmers at the 1986 Commonwealth Games
20th-century Australian people
Medallists at the 1986 Commonwealth Games